The 2017 Indianapolis Colts season was the franchise's 65th season in the National Football League, the 34th in Indianapolis and the tenth playing their home game at Lucas Oil Stadium. It was also the sixth and final season under head coach Chuck Pagano, who was fired at the end of the season. It was also the first under new general manager Chris Ballard, the former Kansas City Chiefs' Director of Football Operations, following the dismissal of Ryan Grigson. The Colts were looking to improve on their 8–8 record from last year and make the playoffs for the first time since 2014. However, star quarterback Andrew Luck suffered a shoulder injury before the regular season began, was placed on the injured reserve list, and missed the remainder of the season that paralleled the 2011 season, when then-starting quarterback Peyton Manning sat out the entire season to undergo neck surgeries and coincidentally, the Colts lost at least 12 games.

After an ineffective performance by backup Scott Tolzien in Week 1 against the Rams, the Colts put Jacoby Brissett as their starting quarterback for the rest of the season. However, Brissett could not save the team as they finished 4-12 for their first losing season since 2011, and missed the playoffs for the third consecutive season.

Roster changes

Free agents

Draft

Notes
 The Colts received one compensatory selection — No. 144 overall.
 The Colts traded their seventh-round selection (No. 233 overall) to the Cleveland Browns in exchange for defensive end Billy Winn.
 The Colts traded Dwayne Allen and their sixth-round selection (No. 200 overall) to the New England Patriots for their fourth-round selection (No. 137 overall).

Undrafted free agents 
Sources

Staff

Final roster

Preseason

Regular season

Schedule

Note: Intra-division opponents are in bold text.

Game summaries

Week 1: at Los Angeles Rams

The first regular season game of the Colts ended in disaster. The offense allowed two pick-sixes and a safety, the defense were unable to stop Sean McVay's high-powered Rams offense, and the special teams missed one field goal.

Week 2: vs. Arizona Cardinals
 The Colts allowed 2 Phil Dawson field goals late in the game, with the 2nd one turning out to be the game winner. The 2nd one came after a Jacoby Brissett interception on the first play of overtime. The Colts fell to 0–2, their third straight such start.

Week 3: vs. Cleveland Browns
 In a battle of 0-2 teams, the Colts took a 28–14 lead at halftime, then halted a Browns comeback in the second half. The Colts improved to 1–2.

Week 4: at Seattle Seahawks
 Despite being tied at 18 in the 3rd quarter, the Colts allowed 28 straight Seattle points to fall to 1–3.

Week 5: vs. San Francisco 49ers
Despite allowing the 49ers to rally from a 23–9 deficit in the 2nd half, the Colts won in overtime on an Adam Vinatieri field goal to improve to 2–3.

Week 6: at Tennessee Titans
 Despite leading 19–9 in the third quarter, the Colts were outscored 27-3 the rest of the way, resulting in their first loss to the Titans since 2011, snapping their 11-game winning streak in the series. The Colts fell to 2–4.

Week 7: vs. Jacksonville Jaguars
Jacksonville dominated the entire game, and beat the Colts in Indianapolis for the first time since 2012. The Colts fell to 2–5. The Colts were also shut out at home for the first time since 1993.

Week 8: at Cincinnati Bengals
 Despite leading for a good portion of the game, a late pick 6 by Jacoby Brissett did the Colts in, as they fell to 2–6.

Week 9: at Houston Texans
 Against the equally disappointing Texans, the Colts improved to 3-6 and snapped their 3-game losing streak to the Texans.

Week 10: vs. Pittsburgh Steelers
 Despite leading 17–3 in the 2nd quarter, the Colts lost to the Steelers 20–17 to fall to 3–7, their 5th straight loss to Pittsburgh.

Week 12: vs. Tennessee Titans
 Despite a 16–6 lead in the 3rd quarter, the Titans managed to pull off the comeback to win 20-16 and send the Colts to 3–8. It was the first time since 2002 that the Colts had been swept by the Titans.

Week 13: at Jacksonville Jaguars
 For the second time this season, the Jaguars managed to dominate Indianapolis, winning this game 30-10 and sending the Colts to 3–9, their 3rd straight road loss to the Jaguars.

Week 14: at Buffalo Bills
 The game in Buffalo, called the "Snow Bowl" by the media, was notable for being held in the midst of a lake-effect snow storm that left over a foot of snow on the stadium's turf in similar weather conditions to games such as the Snowplow Game. The Colts and Bills played a low-scoring affair, tied at 7 by the end of regulation thanks to a fourth quarter touchdown pass from Jacoby Brissett to Jack Doyle. However, LeSean McCoy managed to win the game for the Bills with a 21-yard touchdown run in overtime. The Colts fell to 3–10.

Week 15: vs. Denver Broncos
 The Colts lost at home to the Broncos, who were also on a downspiral season, to fall to 3–11. It was their first loss at home to the Broncos since 2003, ending their 6-game home winning streak against them.

Week 16: at Baltimore Ravens
 The Colts played a close matchup with the playoff-bound Ravens, but it was not enough as the Colts lost and fell to 3–12.

Week 17: vs. Houston Texans
 In a battle for the basement, the Colts defeated the Texans 22-13 and swept the Texans for the first time since 2014. The win also secured the Colts third place in the division.

Standings

Division

Conference

References

External links
 

Indianapolis
Indianapolis Colts seasons
Indianapolis Colts